Banchi Hanuse is a Canadian indigenous filmmaker.

Early life and education 
Hanuse holds a Bachelor of Arts in First Nations Studies from the University of British Columbia.  She currently resides in Bella Coola.

Hanuse has worked at the National Film Board of Canada (NFB) as a production assistant and project coordinator.  Her most well known projects at the NFB include the Finding Dawn, directed by Christine Welsh and Our World, a digital storytelling workshop for remote Indigenous communities.

Haunse also helped found Nuxalk Radio, a radio station based out of the Nuxalk village of Q'umk'uts' (Bella Coola).

Career 
Cry Rock - 2010
Uulx: The Scratcher - 2015
Nuxalk Radio - 2020
Behind the Facade - 2021
Aitamaako'tamisskapi Natosi: Before the Sun - 2023

Awards and nominations 
 Nominated, Best Documentary Short, American Indian Film Festival (2010)
 Best Documentary Short, Vancouver Women in Film Festival (2010)
 Best Documentary Short Subject for Cry Rock, Yorkton Film Festival's Golden Sheaf Award (2011)
 Best Documentary Short for Cry Rock, Vancouver Women in Film Festival (2011)
 Sea to Sky Award for Nuxalk Radio, 2022 Vancouver International Film Festival
 Big Sky Award for Aitamaako'tamisskapi Natosi: Before the Sun, 2023 Big Sky Documentary Film Festival

References 

Created via preloaddraft
Canadian documentary film directors
Living people
First Nations activists
Year of birth missing (living people)
University of British Columbia alumni
Canadian women film directors
First Nations filmmakers
Canadian women documentary filmmakers
Film directors from British Columbia